The Dusty Rhodes Tag Team Classic is an annual professional wrestling tag team tournament held by the American promotion WWE, and is featured on its NXT brand, having first been established in 2015. In subsequent years, wrestlers from the NXT UK and 205 Live brands—both of which are subsidiary/sister brands under the NXT banner—have also been included. While originally just for men, a women's version of the tournament was introduced in 2021 and runs concurrently with the men's tournament.

The tournament was established following the death of WWE Hall of Fame wrestler Dusty Rhodes, who was the creator of and featured star in the Crockett Cup tournaments in the National Wrestling Alliance (NWA) during the mid-late 1980s, which the Dusty Classic is modeled after and has been compared to.

Tournament history
The original 16-team single elimination tournament was established in August 2015 as a tribute to Dusty Rhodes—who had been serving as a senior producer and trainer in NXT—and was formally announced during NXT TakeOver: Brooklyn, which took place shortly after he had died. That year's Classic featured tournament matches taking place all through September both on NXTs weekly TV show and at NXT house shows, and culminated in October at NXT TakeOver: Respect, with the team of Finn Bálor and Samoa Joe winning, having defeated Baron Corbin and Rhyno in the final.

The second Classic took place throughout the fall of 2016—again with a 16-team field—which eventually culminating in November at NXT TakeOver: Toronto, where it was won by The Authors of Pain, having defeated TM-61.

There was no tournament held in 2017 after taking an extra half year to switch to a winter/early spring schedule, returning in 2018. Now featuring an eight-team field, the 2018 Classic culminated at NXT TakeOver: New Orleans, the night before WrestleMania 34. It was won by Adam Cole and Kyle O'Reilly of The Undisputed Era, who successfully defended their NXT Tag Team Championship in a Winners Take All Triple Threat match against both tournament finalists, The Authors of Pain and Roderick Strong and Pete Dunne.

The fourth Classic was held in February and March 2019. Aleister Black and Ricochet won the eight-team tournament, ultimately defeating The Forgotten Sons (Wesley Blake and Steve Cutler) in the final on March 13 during the NXT tapings.

The fifth Classic was announced during the January 1, 2020 episode of NXT. Again featuring an eight-team field, for the first time the tournament included teams from sister brand NXT UK, with both brands having four teams each in the tournament. All four first-round matches featured direct NXT vs. NXT UK matchups, and the semifinals and final also wound up featuring NXT teams vs. NXT UK teams. The BroserWeights (Matt Riddle and Pete Dunne) representing NXT won the tournament, defeating NXT UK's Grizzled Young Veterans (Zack Gibson and James Drake) on the live January 29, 2020 episode of NXT in the final.

The sixth Classic was announced during the December 30, 2020 episode of NXT, and began on January 13, 2021. In 2021, the field increased back to its original format of 16 teams. In addition, teams from 205 Live—which like NXT UK is a subsidiary/sister brand under the NXT banner—would also participate in the tournament (with some matches taking place on 205 Live), as well as NXT alumni the Lucha House Party (now members of the Raw brand), who were invited as guest entrants. Also in 2021, the first women's version of the tournament was announced on January 6, and began on January 20, with matches taking place on both NXT and 205 Live, which also marked the first women's matches to be held on 205 Live.

The seventh Classic was announced during the January 4, 2022 on New Year's Evil. The eight-team men's tournament began on January 18, while the women's tournament began on February 22.

Prize
The winners of the tournament have their names inscribed on the Dusty Rhodes Tag Team Classic Trophy (commonly referred to as the "Dusty Cup"), which is modeled in part after Rhodes' signature "cowboy" style wrestling boots.

Since 2018, the winners of the men's tournament also receive a future NXT Tag Team Championship match. Similarly, the winners of the women's tournament — established in 2021 — also receive a future tag team championship match. The winner's of the inaugural women's tournament had received a match for the WWE Women's Tag Team Championship, but after a controversial finish during the title match, the tournament winners were awarded the inaugural NXT Women's Tag Team Championship, with future winners receiving a match for the titles.  In 2022, Women's Dusty Cup winners Io Shirai and Kay Lee Ray had earned a match for the NXT Women's Tag Team Championship, but instead opted to add themselves to the NXT Women's Championship match between champion Mandy Rose and Cora Jade at Stand & Deliver to make it a fatal four-way match.

Winners

2015 tournament

2016 tournament

2018 tournament

2019 tournament

2020 tournament

2021 tournament

Men's

Women's

2022 tournament

Men's

Women’s

See also 
 List of WWE pay-per-view and WWE Network events

References 

2015 establishments in the United States
WWE tournaments
Recurring events established in 2015
WWE NXT
Tag team tournaments